This local electoral calendar for 2015 lists the subnational elections held in 2015. Referendums, recall and retention elections, and national by-elections (special elections) are also included.

January
4 January: 
Hong Kong, Rural Committees (1st phase)
India, Chhattisgarh, Municipal Corporations, Municipal Councils and Town Councils
Uzbekistan, Regional Councils, District Councils and City Councils (2nd round)
5 January: Belize, Cayo North, House of Representatives by-election
6 January: Federated States of Micronesia, Kosrae, Governor (2nd round)
11 January: 
Hong Kong, Rural Committees (2nd phase)
Japan, Saga, Governor
13 January: India, Madhya Pradesh, District Councils, Township Councils and Village Councils (1st phase)
16 January: India, Rajasthan, District Councils, Township Councils and Village Councils (1st phase)
18 January: Hong Kong, Rural Committees (3rd phase)
22 January: India, Rajasthan, District Councils, Township Councils and Village Councils (2nd phase)
25 January: 
Austria, Lower Austria, 
Comoros
Anjouan, Island Council
Grande Comore, Island Council
Mohéli, Island Council
Hong Kong, Rural Committees (4th phase)
Japan, Yamanashi, 
28 January: India, Chhattisgarh, District Councils, Township Councils and Village Councils (1st phase)
30 January: India, Rajasthan, District Councils, Township Councils and Village Councils (3rd phase)
31 January: 
Australia, Queensland, Legislative Assembly
India, Madhya Pradesh, District Councils, Township Councils, Village Councils (2nd phase) and Mayors

February
1 February: 
France, Doubs's 4th constituency, 
India, Chhattisgarh, District Councils, Township Councils and Village Councils (2nd phase)
Japan, Aichi, 
2 February: Kenya, Homa Bay, Senate by-election
4 February: India, Chhattisgarh, District Councils, Township Councils and Village Councils (3rd phase)
7 February: 
India
Delhi, Legislative Assembly
Rajasthan, District Heads and Township Heads
8 February: 
France, Doubs's 4th constituency, 
India, Rajasthan, District Deputy Heads and Township Deputy Heads
Poland, senatorial constituency No. 75, 
Switzerland, Basel-Landschaft, Executive Council and Landrat
12 February: 
Australia, Lord Howe Island, Board
India, Assam, Municipal Boards and Town Committees
13 February: India, Bangaon, House of the People by-election
15 February: Germany, Hamburg, Parliament
19 February: India, Madhya Pradesh, District Councils, Township Councils and Village Councils (3rd phase)
22 February: 
Comoros, Communal Councils
Hungary, Veszprém 1, 
India, Punjab, Municipal Corporations
24 February: United States, Chicago, Mayor and City Council (1st round)
25 February: India, Punjab, Municipal Councils and Town Councils

March
1 March: 
Austria, Carinthia, 
El Salvador, 
Lithuania
Žirmūnai, 

Tajikistan, Regional Legislatures, City Legislatures and District Legislatures
3 March: 
Federated States of Micronesia, Chuuk, House of Representatives
United States
Los Angeles, City Council (1st round)
Oklahoma City, City Council
Tampa, Mayor and City Council (1st round)
Wichita, Mayor and City Council (1st round)
4 March: Belize, City Councils and Town Councils
8 March: Switzerland
Aargau, 
Appenzell Ausserrhoden, Executive Council and Cantonal Council
Basel-Landschaft, 
Basel-Stadt, 
Geneva, referendum
Grisons, 
Nidwalden, referendum
Schaffhausen, referendums
Schwyz, 
Solothurn, 
13 March: Syria, Rojava, Municipal Councils
15 March: 
Armenia, Mayors, Local Councils and Community Chiefs
Austria
Carinthia, 
Vorarlberg, 
India, Goa, District Councils
Liechtenstein, Mayors and Municipal Councils
Lithuania
Žirmūnai, 

Monaco, Communal Council
Pakistan, NA-137, National Assembly by-election
16 March: 
Kenya, Kajiado Central, National Assembly by-election
16 March – 29 May: Canada, Metro Vancouver, TransLink referendum
18 March: Netherlands
Dutch Provincial Parliaments

Bonaire, Island Council
Saba, Island Council
Sint Eustatius, Island Council
20 March: American Samoa, District 6, House of Representatives by-election
22 March: 
Austria, Styria, 
France, Departemental Councils (1st round)
Guadeloupe, 
Mayotte, 
Réunion, 
Moldova, Gagauzia, Governor
Spain, Andalusia, Parliament
24 March: 
Antigua and Barbuda, Barbuda, Council
United States
Jacksonville, Mayor and City Council (1st round)
Tampa, City Council (2nd round)
27 March: Zimbabwe, Chirumanzu–Zibagwe and Mount Darwin West, House of Assembly by-elections
28 March: 
Australia, New South Wales, Legislative Assembly and Legislative Council
New Zealand, Northland, House of Representatives by-election
29 March: 
Austria
Carinthia, 
Vorarlberg, 
Bolivia, Governors, Departamental Legislative Assemblies, Mayors, Municipal Councils, Beni Provincial Subgovernors, Gran Chaco Regional Assembly and Tarija Sectional Executives
France, Departemental Councils (2nd round)
Guadeloupe, 
Mayotte, 
Réunion, 
Kazakhstan, Regional Councils and City Councils
Portugal, Madeira, Legislative Assembly
Switzerland, Lucerne, Executive Council (1st round) and Cantonal Council
31 March: Cook Islands, Vaipae-Tautu, Parliament by-election

April
7 April: United States
Anchorage, Mayor (1st round)
Chicago, Mayor and City Council (2nd round)
Colorado Springs, Mayor (1st round) and City Council
Ferguson, City Council
Kansas City, MO, Mayor and City Council (1st round)
Las Vegas, Mayor and City Council
St. Louis, Board of Aldermen
Wichita, Mayor and City Council (2nd round)
Wisconsin, Supreme Court and Court of Appeals
8 April: India, Assam, Bodoland, Territorial Council
11 April: 
Malta, Local Councils
Nigeria
Abia, Governor and House of Assembly
Adamawa, Governor and House of Assembly
Akwa Ibom, Governor and House of Assembly
Anambra, House of Assembly
Bauchi, Governor and House of Assembly
Bayelsa, House of Assembly
Benue, Governor and House of Assembly
Borno, Governor and House of Assembly
Cross River, Governor and House of Assembly
Delta, Governor and House of Assembly
Ebonyi, Governor and House of Assembly
Edo, House of Assembly
Ekiti, House of Assembly
Enugu, Governor and House of Assembly
Gombe, Governor and House of Assembly
Imo, Governor and House of Assembly
Jigawa, Governor and House of Assembly
Kaduna, Governor and House of Assembly
Kano, Governor and House of Assembly
Katsina, Governor and House of Assembly
Kebbi, Governor and House of Assembly
Kogi, House of Assembly
Kwara, Governor and House of Assembly
Lagos, Governor and House of Assembly
Nasarawa, Governor and House of Assembly
Niger, Governor and House of Assembly
Ogun, Governor and House of Assembly
Ondo, House of Assembly
Osun, House of Assembly
Oyo, Governor and House of Assembly
Plateau, Governor and House of Assembly
Rivers, Governor and House of Assembly
Sokoto, Governor and House of Assembly
Taraba, Governor and House of Assembly
Yobe, Governor and House of Assembly
Zamfara, Governor and House of Assembly
12 April: 
Hungary, Veszprém 3, 
Japan, Unified Local elections (1st phase)
Aichi, 
Akita, Prefectural Assembly
Aomori, Prefectural Assembly
Chiba, 
Ehime, Prefectural Assembly
Fukui, Governor and Prefectural Assembly
Fukuoka, Governor and Prefectural Assembly
Gifu, Prefectural Assembly
Gunma, Prefectural Assembly
Hiroshima, Prefectural Assembly
Hiroshima City,  and City Council
Hokkaido, Governor and 
Sapporo,  and City Council
Hyōgo, Prefectural Assembly
Ishikawa, Prefectural Assembly
Kagawa, Prefectural Assembly
Kagoshima, Prefectural Assembly
Kanagawa, Governor and 
Yokohama, City Council
Kōchi, Prefectural Assembly
Kumamoto, Prefectural Assembly
Kyoto, Prefectural Assembly
Mie, Governor Prefectural Assembly
Miyazaki, Prefectural Assembly
Nagano, Prefectural Assembly
Nagasaki, Prefectural Assembly
Nara,  and 
Niigata, Prefectural Assembly
Oita,  and 
Okayama, Prefectural Assembly
Osaka, Prefectural Assembly
Saga, Prefectural Assembly
Saitama, 
Shiga, Prefectural Assembly
Shimane, Governor and Prefectural Assembly
Shizuoka, Prefectural Assembly
Tochigi, 
Tokushima, Governor and Prefectural Assembly
Tottori, Governor and Prefectural Assembly
Toyama, Prefectural Assembly
Wakayama, Prefectural Assembly
Yamagata, Prefectural Assembly
Yamaguchi, Prefectural Assembly
Yamanashi, Prefectural Assembly
Switzerland
Schaffhausen, referendum
Zürich, Executive Council and Cantonal Council
17 April: Samoa, Sagaga-le-Usoga, Legislative Assembly by-election
18 April: Nigeria, Rivers, House of Assembly (revote in 6 constituencies)
19 April: 
Cuba, 
Switzerland, Ticino, Council of State and Grand Council
21 April: United States, Navajo Nation, President
22 April: India, Karnataka, Greater Bangalore, Municipal Corporation
23 April: Pakistan, NA-246, National Assembly by-election
25 April: 
India, West Bengal, Municipal Corporations and Municipal Councils
Kolkata, Municipal Corporation
Nigeria
Abia, Governor and House of Assembly (revote in 9 LGAs)
Cross River, Biase and Yakurr 2, House of Assembly (revote)
Imo, Governor and House of Assembly (revote in 250 precincts)
Taraba, Governor and House of Assembly (revote in 8 LGAs)
26 April: 
Argentina, Neuquén, 
Cuba, 
Japan, Unified Local elections (2nd phase), City, Ward, Town and Village Mayors and Councils
Switzerland, Appenzell Innerrhoden

Landsgemeinde
28 April: Bangladesh
Chittagong, Mayor and City Corporation
Dhaka North, Mayor and City Corporation
Dhaka South, Mayor and City Corporation
29 April: South Korea, Ganghwa, Gwanak, Gwangju and Jungwon-gu, 
30 April: India, Mizoram, Village Councils and Local Councils

May
2 May: Australia, Tasmania, (Derwent, Mersey and Windermere) Legislative Council
3 May: 
Bolivia, Beni and Tarija, Governors (2nd round)
Switzerland
Appenzell Innerrhoden, 
Glarus, 
4 May: 
Canada, Prince Edward Island, Legislative Assembly
India, Tripura, Tripura Tribal Areas Autonomous District, Council
Kenya, Kabete, National Assembly by-election
5 May: 
Canada, Alberta, Legislative Assembly
Malaysia, Rompin, House of Representatives by-election
United States
New York's 11th congressional district, U.S. House of Representatives special election
Anchorage, Mayor (2nd round)
Denver, Mayor and City Council (1st round)
7 May: 
Malaysia, Permatang Pauh, House of Representatives by-election
United Kingdom, England, Metropolitan Borough Councils, Unitary Authorities, District Councils, Mayors and Bedfordshire referendum
Birmingham, City Council
Leeds, City Council
Liverpool, City Council
Manchester, City Council
8 May: Philippines, Puerto Princesa, Mayor recall election
9 May: United States
Arlington, Mayor and City Council
Dallas, Mayor and City Council (1st round)
Fort Worth, Mayor and City Council
San Antonio, Mayor and City Council (1st round)
9–22 May: Papua New Guinea, Pomio, National Parliament by-election
10 May: 
Germany, Bremen, Parliament and City Councils
Italy, Aosta Valley and Trentino-Alto Adige/Südtirol, Mayors and Municipal Councils (1st round)
Switzerland, Lucerne, Executive Council (2nd round)
Uruguay, Departmental Mayors, Departmental Councils, Municipal Mayors and Municipal Councils
11 May: Guyana, Regional Democratic Councils
11–25 May: Papua New Guinea, Autonomous Region of Bougainville, President and House of Representatives
12 May: United States, Mississippi's 1st congressional district, U.S. House of Representatives special election (1st round)
13 May: Qatar, Central Municipal Council
17 May: 
Argentina, Salta, 
Japan, Osaka City, Metropolis Plan referendum
19 May: United States
Colorado Springs, Mayor (2nd round)
Jacksonville, Mayor and City Council (2nd round)
Kentucky, Supreme Court special election
Los Angeles, City Council (2nd round)
21 May: Isle of Man, Douglas North and Douglas South, House of Keys by-elections
22 May: Ireland, Carlow–Kilkenny, Assembly by-election
23 May: Nigeria, Rivers, Local Government Councils and Chairmen
24 May: 
Ethiopia, Regional Councils
Italy, Aosta Valley and Trentino-Alto Adige/Südtirol, Mayors and Municipal Councils (2nd round)
Spain, Regional Legislatures, Municipal Councils and Basque Foral Parliaments
Álava, Foral Parliament
Aragon, Parliament
Zaragoza, City Council
Asturias, Parliament
Balearic Islands, Parliament and Island Councils
Barcelona, City Council
Biscay, Foral Parliament
Canary Islands, Parliament and Island Cabildos
Cantabria, Parliament
Castile and León, Parliament
Castile-La Mancha, Parliament
Ceuta, Assembly
Extremadura, Assembly
Gipuzkoa, Foral Parliament
La Rioja, Parliament
Madrid (Community), Assembly
Madrid, City Council
Melilla, Assembly
Murcia, Assembly
Navarre, Parliament
Seville, City Council
Valencian Community, Parliament
Valencia, City Council
25 May: Suriname, District Councils and Local Councils
26 May: India, Jharkhand, Municipal Councils
29 May: India, Karnataka, Village Councils (1st phase)
30 May: 
Bangladesh, Magura-1, House of the Nation by-election
Pakistan, Khyber Pakhtunkhwa, District Councils, Township Councils and Union Councils
31 May: 
Austria
Burgenland, Parliament
Styria, Parliament
Croatia, National Minorities Councils
Italy, Regional Councils, Mayors and Municipal Councils (1st round)
Apulia, Regional Council
Campania, Regional Council
Liguria, Regional Council
Marche, Regional Council
Tuscany, Regional Council
Umbria, Regional Council
Veneto, Regional Council

June
1 June: India, Manipur
Chandel Autonomous District, Council
Churachandpur Autonomous District, Council
Sadar Hills Autonomous District, Council
Senapati Autonomous District, Council
Tamenglong Autonomous District, Council
Ukhrul Autonomous District, Council
2 June: 
India, Karnataka, Village Councils (2nd phase)
United States
Mississippi's 1st congressional district, U.S. House of Representatives special election (2nd round)
Denver, City Council (2nd round)
7 June: 
Armenia, Mayors, Local Councils and Community Chiefs
Germany, Saxony, Mayors (1st round) and District Councilors
Dresden, Mayor (1st round)
Japan, Aomori, 
Lithuania, Širvintos District, and Trakai District, 
Mexico, state elections
Baja California Sur, 
Campeche, 
Colima, 
Federal District, 
Guanajuato, 
Guerrero, 
Jalisco, 
Mexico (state), 
Michoacán, 
Morelos, 
Nuevo León, 
Querétaro, 
San Luis Potosí, 
Sonora, 
Tabasco, 
Yucatán, 
8 June: Pakistan
NA-108, National Assembly by-election
Gilgit-Baltistan, Legislative Assembly
10 June: Zimbabwe, Dangamvura-Chikanga, Dzivarasekwa, Glen View South, Harare East, Headlands, Highfield West, Hurungwe West, Kambuzuma, Kuwadzana, Lobengula, Luveve, Makokoba, Mbizo, Pelandaba-Mpopoma, Pumula and Tsholotsho North, House of Assembly by-elections
13 June: United States
Dallas, Mayor and City Council (2nd round)
San Antonio, Mayor and City Council (2nd round)
14 June: 
Argentina
Río Negro, 
Santa Fe, 
Italy, Mayors and Municipal Councils (2nd round)
Mauritius, Municipal Councils
Moldova, Mayors (1st round), District Councils and Municipal Councils
Gagauzia, Mayors (1st round) and Municipal Councils
Switzerland
Basel-Landschaft, 
Basel-Stadt, 
Geneva, referendum
Grisons, 
Jura, referendums
Nidwalden, referendum
St. Gallen, 
Ticino, referendums
Uri, 
Valais, referendums
Zug, 
Zürich, 
21 June: 
Albania, Mayors, Municipal Councils, Unit Mayors and Unit Councils
Argentina
Mendoza, 
Tierra del Fuego, 
Lithuania, Šilutė District, 
23 June: United States, Kansas City, MO, Mayor and City Council (2nd round)
27 June: United States, Cherokee Nation, Principal Chief, Deputy Chief and Tribal Council (1st round)
28 June: 
Argentina, Tierra del Fuego, 
Benin, 
Germany, Saxony, Mayors (2nd round)
Moldova, Mayors (2nd round)
Gagauzia, Mayors (2nd round)
29 June: Burundi, Communal Councils
30 June: Zambia, Malambo, Mulobezi and Petauke Central, National Assembly by-elections

July
5 July: 
Argentina
Buenos Aires City, 
Córdoba, 
La Rioja, 
Corrientes, Chamber of Deputies, Senate, Mayors and Municipal Councils
Germany, Dresden, Mayor (2nd round)
Japan, Gunma, Governor
7 July: Ghana, Talensi, Parliament by-election
8 July: Belize, Dangriga, House of Representatives by-election
11–24 July: Papua New Guinea, Goilala and Sandaun, National Parliament by-elections
19 July: 
Argentina, Buenos Aires City, 
Mexico, Chiapas, 
North Korea, Provincial People's Assemblies, County People's Assemblies and Municipal People's Assemblies
21 July: United States, Navajo Nation, Presidential Language Requirement referendum
24 July: Zimbabwe, Mudzi West, House of Assembly by-election
25 July: United States, Cherokee Nation, Tribal Council (2nd round)
26 July: Ukraine, Chernihiv constituency 205, 
31 July: Madagascar,

August
4 August: United States, King County, Council (1st round)
6 August: United States, Nashville, Mayor and Metropolitan Council (1st round)
9 August: Japan, Saitama, 
15 August: Botswana, Good Hope-Mabule, National Assembly by-election
16 August: Pakistan, NA-19, National Assembly by-election
19 August: India, Assam, Kamrup District, Morigaon District and Nagaon District, Tiwa Autonomous Council
20 August: Japan, Iwate, 
23 August: Argentina, Tucumán, 
24 August: Burundi, Mayors and Hill Councils
25 August: United States, Phoenix, Mayor and City Council

September
1 September: Ghana, District Assemblies and Unit Committees
4 September: Morocco, 
6 September: 
France, Aveyron's 3rd constituency, 
Germany, Mecklenburg-Vorpommern, 
Guatemala, 
Japan, Iwate, 
8 September: United States, Boston, City Council (1st round)
10 September: 
Isle of Man, Glenfaba and Peel, House of Keys by-elections
United States
Illinois's 18th congressional district, U.S. House of Representatives special election
Nashville, Mayor and Metropolitan Council (2nd round)
13 September: 
Armenia, Mayors, Local Councils and Community Chiefs
France, Aveyron's 3rd constituency, 
Germany, North Rhine-Westphalia, 
Essen, Lord Mayor (1st round)
Nagorno-Karabakh, Mayors, Local Councils and Community Chiefs
Russia, 
Amur Oblast, 
Arkhangelsk Oblast, 
Belgorod Oblast, 
Bryansk Oblast, 
Chelyabinsk Oblast, Legislative Assembly
Chuvashia, 
Irkutsk Oblast, 
Jewish Autonomous Oblast, 
Kaliningrad Oblast, 
Kaluga Oblast,  and 
Kamchatka Krai, 
Kemerovo Oblast, 
Komi Republic, 
Kostroma Oblast,  and 
Krasnodar Krai, 
Kurgan Oblast, 
Leningrad Oblast, 
Magadan Oblast, 
Mari El, 
Novosibirsk Oblast, 
Novosibirsk, Council of Deputies
Omsk Oblast, 
Penza Oblast, 
Rostov Oblast, 
Ryazan Oblast, Duma
Sakhalin Oblast, 
Smolensk Oblast, 
Tambov Oblast, 
Tatarstan, 
Voronezh Oblast, 
Yamalo-Nenets Autonomous Okrug, 
14 September: Norway, County Councils and Municipal Councils
19 September: 
Australia, Canning, House of Representatives by-election
Zimbabwe, Epworth, Marondera Central and Mbire, House of Assembly by-elections
20 September: Argentina, Chaco, 
24 September: Zambia, Lubansenshi and Solwezi West, National Assembly by-elections
27 September: 
Austria, Upper Austria, Parliament, 
Ecuador, La Manga del Cura, 
Germany, North Rhine-Westphalia, 
Essen, Lord Mayor (2nd round)
Russia, Irkutsk Oblast, 
Spain, Catalonia, Parliament

October
6 October: United States
Albuquerque, City Council
Raleigh, Mayor and City Council (1st round)
8 October: United States, Memphis, Mayor and City Council (1st round)
9 October: India
Sikkim, Gangtok Municipal Corporation, Municipal Councils and Town Councils
Uttar Pradesh, District Councils and Township Councils (1st phase)
11 October: 
Austria, Vienna, Parliament
Pakistan, NA-122 and NA-144, National Assembly by-elections
12 October: India
Bihar, Legislative Assembly (1st phase)
Meghalaya, Garo Hills Autonomous District, Council
13 October: India, Uttar Pradesh, District Councils and Township Councils (2nd phase)
15 October: 
Switzerland, Uri, 
Vanuatu, Port Vila, Parliament by-election
16 October: India, Bihar, Legislative Assembly (2nd phase)
17 October: 
Australia
Christmas Island, Shire Council
Cocos (Keeling) Islands, Shire Council
Western Australia, Mayors, Regional Councils, City Councils and Shire Councils
India, Uttar Pradesh, District Councils and Township Councils (3rd phase)
18 October: 
Finland, Åland Islands, Parliament and Municipal Councils
Germany, Cologne, 
Switzerland
Bern, Executive Council (1st round)
Jura, Government (1st round) and Parliament
Neuchâtel, Council of State
Obwalden, referendums
Schaffhausen, referendum
23 October: India, Ladakh, Leh District, Ladakh Autonomous Hill Development Council
24 October: United States, Louisiana
Governor, Lieutenant Governor, Attorney General, Board of Elementary and Secondary Education (1st round), Commissioner of Agriculture and Forestry, Commissioner of Insurance, Secretary of State and Treasurer
House of Representatives and Senate (1st round)
25 October: 
Argentina
Buenos Aires (Province), 
Catamarca, 
Chubut, 
Entre Ríos, 
Formosa, 
Jujuy, 
La Pampa, 
Misiones, 
San Juan, 
San Luis, 
Santa Cruz, 
Bulgaria, Mayors (1st round), Municipal Councils and Ward Mayors
Colombia, Governors, Departmental Assemblies, Mayors, Municipal Councils and Local Administrative Boards
Bogotá, 
Cali, 
Medellín, 
Haiti, Mayors
India, Goa, Municipal Councils
Japan, Miyagi, 
Tanzania, Zanzibar, President, House of Representatives, District Councils, Town Councils and Municipal Council
Ukraine, City Mayors, Town Mayors, Village Mayors (1st round), Oblast Councils, Raion Councils, City Councils, Urban-District Councils, Town Councils and Village Councils
28 October: India, Bihar, Legislative Assembly (3rd phase)
29 October: India, Uttar Pradesh, District Councils and Township Councils (4th phase)
31 October: Pakistan
Punjab, Metropolitan Corporations, Municipal Corporations, Municipal Committees, District Councils and Unions Councils (1st phase)
Sindh, Metropolitan Corporations, District Municipal Corporations, Municipal Corporations, Municipal Committees, Town Committees, Union Committees, District Councils and Union Councils (1st phase)

November
1 November: 
Bulgaria, Mayors (2nd round)
India, Bihar, Legislative Assembly (4th phase)
2 November: India, Kerala, Municipal Corporations, Municipal Councils, District Councils, Township Councils and Village Councils (1st phase)
3 November: United States, State and Local elections
Kentucky, Governor, Agriculture Commissioner, Attorney General, Auditor, Secretary of State and Treasurer
Mississippi
Governor, Lieutenant Governor, Attorney General, Auditor, Commissioner of Agriculture and Commerce, Commissioner of Insurance, Public Service Commission, Secretary of State, Transportation Commission and Treasurer
House of Representatives and Senate
Public Schools constitutional referendum
New Jersey, General Assembly
Pennsylvania, Supreme Court, Commonwealth Court and Superior Court
Virginia, House of Delegates and Senate
Washington, Court of Appeals
Aurora, CO, Mayor and City Council
Boston, City Council (2nd round)
Charlotte, Mayor and City Council
Columbus, Mayor and City Council
Houston, Mayor, City Council (1st round) and Sexual Orientation and Gender Identity Discrimination referendum
Indianapolis, Mayor and City-County Council
King County, Council (2nd round)
Seattle, City Council
Miami, City Commission (1st round)
Philadelphia, Mayor and City Council
Pittsburgh, City Council
Raleigh, City Council (2nd round)
San Francisco, Mayor, City Attorney, District Attorney, Sheriff, Treasurer, Community College Board and Referendums
Tucson, Mayor and City Council
5 November: India
Bihar, Legislative Assembly (5th phase)
Kerala, Municipal Corporations, Municipal Councils, District Councils, Township Councils and Village Councils (2nd phase)
8 November: 
Myanmar, State and Regional Hluttaws and Ethnic Affairs Ministers
Switzerland
Basel-Landschaft, 
Jura, Government (2nd round)
10 November: Federated States of Micronesia, Pohnpei, Governor (1st round) and State Legislature
14 November: Sierra Leone, Constituency 107, Parliament by-election
15 November: 
Japan, Fukushima, 
Paraguay, 
Switzerland
Basel-Stadt, 
Bern, Executive Council (2nd round)
Lucerne, 
Schaffhausen, referendum
St. Gallen, 
Ukraine, City Mayors, Town Mayors, Village Mayors (2nd round and revote) and Village Councils (revote)
17 November: United States, Miami, City Commission (2nd round)
19 November: 
Pakistan
Punjab, Metropolitan Corporations, Municipal Corporations and Municipal Committees, District Councils and Unions Councils (2nd phase)
Sindh, Metropolitan Corporations, District Municipal Corporations, Municipal Corporations, Municipal Committees, Town Committees, Union Committees, District Councils and Union Councils (2nd phase)
United States, Memphis, City Council (2nd round)
21 November: 
India, Ratlam and Warangal, House of the People by-elections
Nigeria, Kogi, Governor
United States, Louisiana
Governor, Lieutenant Governor, Attorney General and Board of Elementary and Secondary Education (2nd round)
House of Representatives and Senate (2nd round)
22 November: 
Hong Kong, District Councils
India
Gujarat, Municipal Corporations
Ahmedabad, Municipal Corporation
Jharkhand, District Councils, Township Councils and Village Councils (1st phase)
Japan, Osaka, 
Switzerland, Zürich, 
23 November: Canada, Northwest Territories, Legislative Assembly
24 November: Japan, Kochi, Governor
27 November: Namibia, Regional Councils and Local Councils
28 November: India
Jharkhand, District Councils, Township Councils and Village Councils (2nd phase)
Mizoram, Lai Autonomous District, Council
Uttar Pradesh, Village Heads and Village Councils (1st phase)
29 November: 
Germany, Hamburg and Kiel, 2024 Olympics referendum
India, Gujarat, Municipal Councils, District Councils and Township Councils
Switzerland
Nidwalden, referendums
Valais, referendums
Transnistria, District Chairs, District Councils, Mayors and Municipal Councils
Ukraine, Village Mayors and Village Councils (revote), and Krasnoarmiysk and Mariupol, Mayors and City Councils
30 November: 
Canada, Newfoundland and Labrador, House of Assembly
Pakistan, Islamabad Capital Territory, Union Councils

December
1 December: India, Uttar Pradesh, Village Heads and Village Councils (2nd phase)
2 December: Guernsey, Saint Peter Port North, Parliament by-election
3 December: United Kingdom, Oldham West and Royton, House of Commons by-election
5 December: 
Australia, North Sydney, House of Representatives by-election
India
Jharkhand, District Councils, Township Councils and Village Councils (3rd phase)
Uttar Pradesh, Village Heads and Village Councils (3rd phase)
Nigeria
Bayelsa, Governor
Kogi, Governor (revote in 91 precincts)
Pakistan
Punjab, Metropolitan Corporations, Municipal Corporations and Municipal Committees, District Councils and Unions Councils (3rd phase)
Sindh, Metropolitan Corporations, District Municipal Corporations, Municipal Corporations, Municipal Committees, Town Committees, Union Committees, District Councils and Union Councils (3rd phase)
Karachi, Union Councils
6 December: 
France
Regional Councils (1st round)
Guadeloupe, 
Réunion, 
Corsica, 
French Guiana, 
Martinique, 
Mexico, First Federal Electoral District of Aguascalientes, 
8 December: Federated States of Micronesia, Pohnpei, Governor (2nd round)
9 December: 
India
Tripura, Municipal Corporation, Municipal Councils and Town Councils
Uttar Pradesh, Village Heads and Village Councils (4th phase)
Indonesia, Governors, Regents and Mayors
12 December: 
India, Jharkhand, District Councils, Township Councils and Village Councils (4th phase)
Saudi Arabia, Municipal Councils
Sierra Leone, Bombali, Parliament by-election
United States, Houston, Mayor and City Council (2nd round)
13 December: 
Andorra, Municipal Councils
France
Regional Councils (2nd round)
Guadeloupe, 
Réunion, 
Corsica, 
French Guiana, 
Martinique, 
15 December: Ghana, Amenfi West, Parliament by-election
18 December: Netherlands, Bonaire, Status referendum
19 December: 
Jordan, Karak's 2nd district, House of Representatives by-election
Nigeria, Ekiti, Local Government Councils and Chairmen
Zimbabwe, Nkulumane, House of Assembly by-election
22 December: 
India, Madhya Pradesh, Municipal Corporations and Municipal Councils
Malawi, Zomba Chisi, National Assembly by-election
23 December: Pakistan, NA-154, National Assembly by-election
29 December: Liberia, Lofa 2, House of Representatives by-election
30 December: Bangladesh, Mayors and Municipal Councils

References

2015 elections
2015
Political timelines of the 2010s by year
local